Parmenio Adams (September 9, 1776 – February 19, 1832) was a businessman and politician from New York. He served as a member of the United States House of Representatives.

Biography
Adams was born in Simsbury, Connecticut, to Parmenio Adams and Chloe Nearing. He married Eleanor Wells on October 23, 1795 and they had four children, James, Sarah, Sarah, and Laura.

In 1806, Adams moved his family to Phelps Corners, which is now located in part of the Village of Attica, which lies in the Town of Alexander. Adams served as lieutenant of light Infantry, captain of Grenadiers, second and first major, and division inspector of Infantry in the New York State Militia from 1806 until 1816. During the War of 1812, he was active on the Niagara frontier as Major, division inspector of Infantry, and commandant of the New York Volunteers.

Adams was Sheriff of Genesee County from 1815 to 1816 and again from 1818 to 1821. He had agricultural interests, ran a gristmill, and was a construction contractor on the Erie Canal.

At the United States House of Representatives elections in New York, 1822, Isaac Wilson was declared elected in the 29th District by a small margin. Adams contested Wilson's election, showing that the returns had been certified mistakenly, and Adams was seated in the 18th United States Congress as an Adams-Clay Democratic-Republican on January 7, 1824. Adams was re-elected as an Adams man to the 19th United States Congress, holding office until March 3, 1827. He returned to his personal businesses.

Death
Adams died in Alexander, Genesee County, New York, on February 19, 1832. He is interred at Forest Hill Cemetery, in the Town of Attica, now in Wyoming County.

References

External links

 The New York Civil List compiled by Franklin Benjamin Hough (pp. 71 and 400; Weed, Parsons and Co., 1858)
 Obit transcribed at Ancestry.com
 Cases of Contested Elections in Congress 1789 to 1834 compiled by Matthew St. Clair Clarke and David A. Hall (Washington, D.C., 1834; Case XLIX, pp. 369ff)
 
 Adams-Cotton family marker at the Forest Hill Cemetery

1776 births
1832 deaths
People from Simsbury, Connecticut
Democratic-Republican Party members of the United States House of Representatives from New York (state)
National Republican Party members of the United States House of Representatives from New York (state)
Sheriffs of Genesee County, New York
People from Alexander, New York
People from Attica, New York
American militiamen in the War of 1812
People from New York (state) in the War of 1812